Spies of the Air (also known as Spies in the Air and The Fifth Column) is a 1939 British adventure film directed by David MacDonald and based on the play Official Secret by Jeffrey Dell. The film stars Barry K. Barnes, Roger Livesey, Basil Radford, Edward Ashley  and Felix Aylmer. Spies of the Air involves espionage in the period just before the outbreak of war in Europe that spawned a number of similar propaganda films linking aeronautics and spies. Films in both Great Britain and the United States centred on "... spies and fifth columnists (as) the staple diet of films made during the first year of the war."

Plot
Before the outbreak of the Second World War,  British test pilot Peter Thurloe (Barry K. Barnes) is involved in an illicit love affair with his employer's wife, Dorothy Houghton (Joan Marion). He is caught up in an elaborate scheme to steal secrets from Charles Houghton's (Roger Livesey) aviation company. Peter is suspected of betraying his country to a foreign power. Scotland Yard Inspector Colonel Cairns (Felix Aylmer) is aware that the plans of a top-secret aircraft would be of great interest to an enemy.

Cast

 Barry K. Barnes as Peter Thurloe
 Roger Livesey as Charles Houghton
 Felix Aylmer as Colonel Cairns
 Basil Radford as Madison
 Edward Ashley as Stuart
 Santos Casani as Foreigner
 Wallace Douglas as Hooper
 Everley Gregg as Mrs. Madison
 Joan Marion as Dorothy Houghton
 Henry Oscar as Porter
 John Turnbull as Sir Andrew Hamilton

Production

Filming took place at Nettlefold Studios, Walton-on-Thames, Surrey, England, UK. The Air Ministry was interested in the production and allowed the latest Royal Air Force aircraft to be filmed from a commercial aircraft. A Percival Vega Gull (G-AEYC) and Miles M.14A Magister I/Hawk Trainer III (L6908) were featured in the film, as well as a brief glimpse of a de Havilland Dragon Rapide.

Made in 1939 and released in March 1939 in the United Kingdom, by the time Spies of the Air was in widespread release, war had already been declared. For its US release in a much abridged form, the film was originally going to be re-titled as The Fifth Column, but Ernest Hemingway sued the production company, as he felt that the new title infringed on his The Fifth Column and the First Forty-Nine Stories anthology released the previous year. Hemingway won the suit, and the film reverted to its original title, although it also appeared as Spies in the Air.

Reception
Spies of the Air was quickly relegated to "second feature" status, as the release of the similar themed Q Planes  (1939), with a much better known cast, overshadowed the more modest production. Hal Erickson wrote, "The flight sequences blend stock footage and newly-shot aerial scenes with acceptable expertise."

After the lawsuit by Hemingway had been settled, Spies in the Air had its US premiere in New York in 1940, and was reviewed by Bosley Crowther of The New York Times: "David MacDonald has purloined a page from the book of Alfred Hitchcock, but without the latter's sense of timing or knack of pointing a climax."

References

Notes

Citations

Bibliography

 Brownlow, Kevin. David Lean: A Biography. New York: St. Martins Press, 1997. .
 Mackenzie, S.P. British War Films, 1939–45. London: Bloomsbury Academic, 2003. .
 Mavis, Paul. The Espionage Filmography: United States Releases, 1898 through 1999. Jefferson, North Carolina: McFarland and Company, 2001. .
 Warren, Patricia. The British Film Collection 1896-1984. London: Elm Tree Books, 1984. .

External links

1940 films
1940s adventure films
1940s spy films
British spy films
British aviation films
Films directed by David MacDonald (director)
British films based on plays
Films set in Wiltshire
Films set in London
Films shot at Nettlefold Studios
British adventure films
British black-and-white films
1940s English-language films
1930s English-language films
1930s British films
1940s British films